Atluri (Telugu: అట్లూరి) is an Indian surname.

Notable people with the surname include:
 Atluri Pitcheswara Rao (1925 – 1966), Telugu language writer
 Atluri Purnachandra Rao (1925 - ), Indian film producer
 Atluri Sriman Narayana, Indian dental surgeon
 Rakshit Atluri, Indian actor
 Satya N. Atluri (born 1945), Indian-American engineer
 Venky Atluri, Indian film director
 Vijay Atluri (born 1956), Indian computer scientist

Indian surnames